Stanislav Galimov (born February 12, 1988) is a Russian professional ice hockey goaltender who is currently playing with Avangard Omsk in the Kontinental Hockey League (KHL).

On 27 July 2021, Galimov signed a one-year contract as a free agent to play in the Liiga with his second non-Russian club, Kärpät.

Awards and achievements

References

External links

1988 births
Living people
Ak Bars Kazan players
Atlant Moscow Oblast players
HC CSKA Moscow players
Dinamo Riga players
Metallurg Magnitogorsk players
Oulun Kärpät players
Russian ice hockey goaltenders
Torpedo Nizhny Novgorod players
Traktor Chelyabinsk players
People from Magnitogorsk
Sportspeople from Chelyabinsk Oblast